Midnapore is a community within the City of Calgary in the province of Alberta, Canada. It is bounded to the north and east by Fish Creek Provincial Park, to the south by Sun Valley Boulevard and to the west by Macleod Trail.

History 
Midnapore was once an unincorporated hamlet under the jurisdiction of the Municipal District of Turner Valley No. 32. The Hamlet of Midnapore and adjoining lands were annexed by the City of Calgary on December 30, 1961. Following annexation, Midnapore was established as a neighbourhood in 1977. The Fish-Creek Lacombe C-Train station, which serves part of Calgary's current LRT light rail transit system, recalls Midnapore's former past through its modern interpretation of the former Midnapore rail station.

Amenities
Midnapore has a mall (the Midnapore Mall), a community centre (Mid-Sun Community Association) which it shares with the adjacent community of Sundance, as well as many fast food restaurants including McDonald's, Wendy's, Tim Hortons, Taco Time and Subway. The community also has its own man-made lake which is used by residents in summer for water sports and in winter for skating and tobogganing. Some houses in Midnapore border onto the lake and towards the northern part of the community, houses border onto Fish Creek Provincial Park. It is not uncommon to see wildlife such as deer, foxes and coyotes wandering around this area of the community. White-tailed Jackrabbits, both red and gray squirrels and a variety of birds such as black-billed magpies, black-capped chickadees, merlin and house finches are found year-round in Midnapore.

Midnapore also has a large business section with a Re/Max office, Tri-Services station (police, EMS and Fire), Wingate Inn, Beverly Centre elderly facility, a private elementary and junior high school, Kingdom Hall of Jehovah's Witnesses, and offices for H & R Block, Genstar, and a medical clinic. Midnapore has two elementary schools: Mother Teresa (separate-Catholic) and Midnapore Elementary. Midnapore is also the home to St. Mary's University and Father Lacombe Nursing Home. Midnapore is served by a number of transit bus routes that feed to Somerset-Bridlewood, Shawnessy, and Fish Creek-Lacombe train stations.

Demographics

Residents in this community had a median household income of $62,067 in 2000, and there were 10% low income residents living in the neighbourhood. As of 2000, 12.3% of the residents were immigrants. A proportion of 14.3% of the buildings were condominiums or apartments, and 25.8% of the housing was used for renting.

Education
The community is served by Midnapore Elementary and Fish Creek Elementary public schools, as well as by Mother Teresa of Calcutta Elementary, Father James Whelihan Elementary and Junior High (Catholic), Midsun Junior High School (public)  and Trinity Christian School (Christian private).

Lake
Midnapore has a community lake; the 12-hectare lake was dredged in the summer of 1976. Around 1.15 million m³ of earth were moved, some 32,0000m³ of which were used to create a 17m hill on the adjoining park. The lake contains 625 million litres of water, to a maximum depth of 10m. The park is used for swimming, boating and fishing in the summer and winter sports.

Homeowners in the community are taxed in the form of encumbrances on their property, which goes toward maintaining the lake.

See also 
 List of neighbourhoods in Calgary

References

External links
Midnapore-Sundance community association

Neighbourhoods in Calgary